Dobrynin  is a village in the administrative district of Gmina Przecław, within Mielec County, Subcarpathian Voivodeship, in south-eastern Poland.

References

Dobrynin